Carlos Carnes Ogden, Sr. (May 9, 1917 – April 2, 2001) was a United States Army officer and a recipient of the United States military's highest decoration — the Medal of Honor — for his actions in World War II.

Biography
Ogden joined the Army from Fairmount, Illinois in April 1941, and by June 25, 1944, was serving as a first lieutenant in Company K, 314th Infantry Regiment, 79th Infantry Division. During a firefight on that day, near Fort du Roule, France, Ogden single-handedly destroyed three German gun emplacements. For his actions, he was awarded the Medal of Honor one year later, on June 28, 1945.

Ogden reached the rank of major before leaving the Army. He died at age 83 and was buried in Arlington National Cemetery, Arlington County, Virginia.

Medal of Honor citation
Ogden's official Medal of Honor citation reads:
On the morning of June 25, 1944, near Fort du Roule, guarding the approaches to Cherbourg, France, 1st Lt. Ogden's company was pinned down by fire from a German 88-mm. gun and 2 machineguns. Arming himself with an M-1 rifle, a grenade launcher, and a number of rifle and handgrenades, he left his company in position and advanced alone, under fire, up the slope toward the enemy emplacements. Struck on the head and knocked down by a glancing machinegun bullet, 1st Lt. Ogden, in spite of his painful wound and enemy fire from close range, continued up the hill. Reaching a vantage point, he silenced the 88mm. gun with a well-placed rifle grenade and then, with handgrenades, knocked out the 2 machineguns, again being painfully wounded. 1st Lt. Ogden's heroic leadership and indomitable courage in alone silencing these enemy weapons inspired his men to greater effort and cleared the way for the company to continue the advance and reach its objectives.

See also

List of Medal of Honor recipients
List of Medal of Honor recipients for World War II

Notes

References

1917 births
2001 deaths
United States Army personnel of World War II
United States Army Medal of Honor recipients
Burials at Arlington National Cemetery
People from Edgar County, Illinois
United States Army officers
World War II recipients of the Medal of Honor
People from Vermilion County, Illinois
Military personnel from Illinois
Battle of Normandy recipients of the Medal of Honor